Erioptera parva is a species of limoniid crane fly in the family Limoniidae.

Subspecies
These two subspecies belong to the species Erioptera parva:
 Erioptera parva brasiliensis Alexander, 1913
 Erioptera parva parva

References

Limoniidae
Articles created by Qbugbot
Insects described in 1859